Genoese Dragnet is a 1952 Italian crime-melodrama film. The movie relates the story of Michele, a man accused of murdering a kidnapped girl and his fight to prove his innocence.

Plot 
Genoa. Two wealthy spouses have their little daughter kidnapped. The kidnappers ask for a ransom of twenty million: the father makes the payment but the girl is not released. The searches start and in a short time it turns out that her child died of suffocation. The outrage of public opinion initiates the investigation, but it takes many months before the arrest of the alleged culprit, a mechanic of a garage who cannot justify his sudden enrichment.

After an intense interrogation, he admits to having driven the vehicle in which the child was taken to the kidnappers' lair, while totally ignoring the purpose of the mission. For fear he did not report the leader of the gang, who gave him part of the ransom before fleeing.  He is sent for trial and, during the trial that follows, the wife of the mechanic, a cashier in the bar where the head of the gang worked, has a seriously ill son and in order to get the money she agrees to become the boss's lover. However, the woman realizes that she still loves her husband and therefore decides to collaborate with her defense lawyer. The gang leader is killed as soon as he sets foot in Genoa; the owner of the bar is accused of the murder and sentenced to life in prison. The mechanic is sentenced to a light sentence; once he is out, after a few months, he will forget his wife's betrayal for the sake of his son.

Cast
 Lianella Carell as Gianna
 Cesare Danova as Lawyer Enzo Pirani
 Charles Rutherford as Michele Esposito
 Arnoldo Foà as Basilio
 Marcello Giorda as Gabriele
 Carlo Lombardi as Judge Ranieri
 Tina Lattanzi as Ranieri's Wife
 Ignazio Balsamo as Giovanni Feruglio
 Domenico Modugno as Police Commissioner
 Memmo Carotenuto as Carcerato
 Carlo Sposito as Worker

References

External links
 

Processo contro ignoti

1952 films
1950s Italian-language films
Films directed by Guido Brignone
Italian black-and-white films
Italian crime drama films
1952 crime drama films
Melodrama films
1950s Italian films